Azie Mira Dungey is an American actress, producer, and writer. She wrote and played the lead role in the comedic web series "Ask a Slave," and is currently, ". . .writing a book as a follow-up to the series." Dungey also wrote for the Emmy nominated Netflix series Unbreakable Kimmy Schmidt and Girls5eva, both produced by Tina Fey and Robert Carlock. She also wrote and produced on Sweetbitter  on Starz based on the bestselling novel of the same title by Stephanie Danler. Dungey wrote and hosted on Season 1 of Say It Loud, an educational series for PBS Digital. In 2019, she was executive producer and writer for Lena Waithe's Twenties,  a sit-com on BET and Showtime, as well as the Tracy Oliver and Amy Poehler produced comedy series, Harlem for Amazon Studios.

Early life and education
Dungey was born in Washington, DC. She spent her early childhood in Philadelphia, PA and later moved to Maryland where she attended middle and high school. She was a drama major at New York University, graduating from the Tisch School of the Arts.

Dungey is Pamunkey (also Mattaponi) and a very active member of the Native community. The tribe’s enrollment policies that excluded members who married or had children with African Americans was exposed by the Congressional Black Caucus during their recognition process in 2013. Dungey comes from a family that was victim to Pamunkey anti-Black tribal law and they are currently seeking enrollment.

Career

Dungey took part in a number of theatre productions in Washington, DC, including The Walworth Farce at Studio Theatre.
 
Dungey performed the role of a slave as part of an ongoing historical reenactment of life at the Mount Vernon plantation in Virginia, USA, once owned by President George Washington. Part of her job was to answer tourists' questions about slavery while staying in character. She worked there part-time for nearly two years from 2010-2012.

In 2013, Dungey moved to Los Angeles. She then wrote the script for a web series called Ask a Slave, and performed the lead role, that of Lizzie Mae, a slave.  The series includes actual incidents from her experiences on the plantation. The series has received more than two million views.

As a result, Salon magazine listed her as one of 10 black women SNL could hire.

References

External links
Ask a Slave official website
 

Year of birth missing (living people)
Living people
American television writers
Tisch School of the Arts alumni
African-American actresses